Romania has an agricultural capacity of approximately , of which only 10 million are used as arable land. In 2008, an evaluation revealed that 6.8 million hectares are not used. In 2018, Romania was the third biggest agricultural producer of the EU and produced the largest amount of maize.

Agriculture summed up about 4.3% of GDP in 2019, down from 12.6% in 2004. As of 2017, 25.8% of the Romanian workforce is employed in agriculture, compared to an EU average of 4.4%. As of 2016, only 1.6% of Romanian farmers were recipients of tertiary education, compared to an 8.9% EU average.

Mechanization is comparatively poor, with one tractor available for every 54 hectares, while the EU average is one tractor for every 13 hectares. Approximately 170,000 tractors exist in Romania, of which about 80% are aging or obsolete. In many regions of the country, farmers still use horse-drawn agriculture tools and rely on animal power. Unlike Western Europe, where tractors are replaced after 3,000-4,000 hours of use, in Romania they sometimes last up to 12,000 hours.

The main problems encountered by Romanian agriculturists are a lack of major investments in agriculture, due to difficulty in accessing available funds, fragmentation and erosion of soil, property-related lawsuits and obsolete technology. Several major companies have entered the Romanian market, including Smithfield Foods, Cargill, Bunge, Glencore, Lactalis, and Meggle AG. These companies have since invested hundreds of millions of euros in Romania.

Production

According to the National Statistics Institute, in 2006 991,000 ha of sun-flower and 191,000 ha of soybean were cultivated. Cereal production in 2006 stood at 15.1 million tons, including 5.3 million tons of wheat and 8.6 million tons of maize. In 2007, a severe drought destroyed over 60% of crops. Wheat production subsequently fell to 3 million tons, and prices fell 25%. Analysts claimed it was the worst harvest since 1940.

Cereal, fruit and vegetable production: (thousands of tons)

Through the Common Agricultural Policy, Romania will receive 14.5 billion euros between 2007 and 2013, according to statements made by the World Bank.

Romania produced in 2018:

 18.6 million tons of maize (9th largest producer in the world);
 10.1 million tons of wheat (16th largest producer in the world);
 3 million tons of sunflower seeds (4th largest producer in the world, only behind Ukraine, Russia and Argentina);
 3 million tons of potatoes;
 1.8 million tons of barley;
 1.6 million tons of rapeseed;
 1.1 million tons of grapes (17th largest producer in the world);
 1 million tons of cabbage;
 978 thousand tons of sugar beets, which are used to produce sugar and ethanol;
 842 thousand tons of plums (2nd largest producer in the world, only behind China);
 742 thousand tons of tomatoes;
 643 thousand tons of apples;
 521 thousand tons of watermelons;
 465 thousand tons of soy;
 383 thousand tons of oats;

In addition to smaller productions of other agricultural products.

Romanian agricultural research
Agricultural research in Romania developed mainly through the Agronomical Research Institute (founded 1927), and post-World War II through its successor, the Research Institute for Cereals and Industrial Crops. Some of the main Romanian agricultural scientists include Ion Ionescu de la Brad, Gheorghe Ionescu-Sisești, Nichifor Ceapoiu, Zoe Țapu, Alexandru-Viorel Vrânceanu, Cristian Hera, Nicolae N. Săulescu, and others.

Genetically modified crops
Genetically modified soybean was legal to cultivate and sell until entry into the EU in 2007, whereupon they were banned. This resulted in an immediate withdrawal of 70% of the soybean hectares in 2008 and a trade deficit of €117.4m for purchase of replacement products. Farmer sentiment is very much in favour of relegalisation.

References